The 2014 FIS Ski Jumping Grand Prix was the 21st Summer Grand Prix season in ski jumping on plastic for men and the 3rd for ladies. The season began on 25 July 2014 in Wisła, Poland and will end on 4 October 2014 in Klingenthal, Germany.

First time in history of ski jumping a new rule of three series in individual events was introduced which was tested for ski flying events in the winter. A rule where three jumps counted in total points, including the qualification round a day before. 48 qualified jumpers advance in first round of competition where they were divided in 4 groups of 12 competitors. In the final round advanced 24 jumpers, 6 best of each group started from back order. There was a big confusion even amongst competitors. That's why they cancelled this rule and wasn't used in the ski flying events.

Other competitive circuits this season included the World Cup, Continental Cup and Alpen Cup.

Calendar

Men

Ladies

Men's team

Men's standings

Overall

Nations Cup

Ladies' standings

Overall

Nations Cup

References

Grand Prix
FIS Grand Prix Ski Jumping